The meridian 25° west of Greenwich is a line of longitude that extends from the North Pole across the Arctic Ocean, Greenland, the Atlantic Ocean, Cape Verde Islands, the Southern Ocean, and Antarctica to the South Pole.

The 25th meridian west forms a great circle with the 155th meridian east.

In Antarctica, the meridian defines the eastern limit of Argentina's territorial claim and passes through the British claim - the two claims overlap.

From Pole to Pole
Starting at the North Pole and heading south to the South Pole, the 25th meridian west passes through:

{| class="wikitable plainrowheaders"
! scope="col" width="125" | Co-ordinates
! scope="col" | Country, territory or sea
! scope="col" | Notes
|-
| style="background:#b0e0e6;" | 
! scope="row" style="background:#b0e0e6;" | Arctic Ocean
| style="background:#b0e0e6;" |
|-
| 
! scope="row" | 
| Peary Land peninsula
|-
| style="background:#b0e0e6;" | 
! scope="row" style="background:#b0e0e6;" | G.B. Schley Fjord
| style="background:#b0e0e6;" |
|-
| 
! scope="row" | 
| Peary Land peninsula
|-
| style="background:#b0e0e6;" | 
! scope="row" style="background:#b0e0e6;" | Independence Fjord
| style="background:#b0e0e6;" |
|-
| 
! scope="row" | 
|
|-
| style="background:#b0e0e6;" | 
! scope="row" style="background:#b0e0e6;" | Hagen Fjord
| style="background:#b0e0e6;" |
|-valign="top"
| 
! scope="row" | 
| Mainland, Ymer Island, Ella Island and the mainland again (passing through the Stauning Alps at )
|-
| style="background:#b0e0e6;" | 
! scope="row" style="background:#b0e0e6;" | Scoresby Sound
| style="background:#b0e0e6;" |
|-
| 
! scope="row" | 
|
|-valign="top"
| style="background:#b0e0e6;" | 
! scope="row" style="background:#b0e0e6;" | Atlantic Ocean
| style="background:#b0e0e6;" | Passing just east of São Miguel Island, Azores,  (at ) Passing just west of the islet of Formigas, Azores,  (at ) Passing just east of Santa Maria Island, Azores,  (at )
|-
| 
! scope="row" | 
| Islands of Santo Antão and São Vicente
|-
| style="background:#b0e0e6;" | 
! scope="row" style="background:#b0e0e6;" | Atlantic Ocean
| style="background:#b0e0e6;" |
|-
| style="background:#b0e0e6;" | 
! scope="row" style="background:#b0e0e6;" | Southern Ocean
| style="background:#b0e0e6;" |
|-valign="top"
| 
! scope="row" | Antarctica
| Defines the eastern limit of Argentine Antarctica, claimed by  Passes through British Antarctic Territory, claimed by 
|-
|}

See also
24th meridian west
26th meridian west

w025 meridian west